Himawari 9 is a Japanese weather satellite, the 9th of the Himawari geostationary weather satellite operated by the Japan Meteorological Agency. The spacecraft was constructed by Mitsubishi Electric, and is the second of two similar satellites to be based on the DS-2000 bus.

Launch
Himawari 9 was launched on 2 November 2016, 06:20:00 UTC, atop a H-IIA rocket flying from the Yoshinobu Launch Complex Pad 1 at the Tanegashima Space Center, and by 11 November 2016 it reached to the geostationary point at 140.7 degrees East.  After initial function tests, it was put on standby until 05:00 UTC by 13 December 2022, when it succeeded Himawari 8.

The launch was scheduled initially on 1 November 2016, but postponed for one day due to the bad weather forecast.

It has a design life of 15 years with 8 years of operational life. Power is supplied by a single gallium arsenide solar panel, which provides up to 2.6 kilowatts of power. The main instrument aboard Himawari 9 is a 16 channel multispectral imager to capture visible light and infrared images of the Asian-Pacific region.

As part of an outreach project organized by the Young Astronauts Club Japan the launch also carried manga artwork drawn by Chūya Koyama, author of the Space Brothers manga.

Gallery

References

External links

Meteorological Satellite Center of JMA
Himawari 9 3D model from Asahi Shinbun

Satellites using the DS2000 bus
Spacecraft launched in 2016
2016 in Japan
Himawari satellite series